WBLO (790 AM) is a radio station broadcasting a Spanish language Adult Contemporary radio format. Licensed to Thomasville, North Carolina, it serves the Piedmont Triad.  The station is owned by GHB Radio and is leased to Norsan Multimedia.

By day, WBLO is powered at 10,000 watts.  But to protect other stations on 790 AM, at night it greatly reduces power to 26 watts.  Programming is also heard on FM translator W295CE at 106.9 MHz in Winston-Salem.

History
The station signed on in September 1947, and held the call sign WTNC. It originally ran 1,000 watts, during daytime hours only.

Buddy Poole and other partners bought WTNC and its FM station in 1984, and Poole served as general manager for 18 years.

When the station moved to High Point in the early 2000s, it played southern gospel music. On March 1, 2003, the station's call sign was changed to WIST. It aired an adult standards format along with WIST-FM. Its call sign was briefly changed to WFIK on November 12, 2004, before being changed to WZXY on November 26, 2004. The WBLO letters, the name "The Ball" and the sports talk format were adopted December 14, 2004.

On June 4, 2010, Norberto Sanchez of Norsan Multimedia said that his company would lease WIST-FM and WBLO, with an option to buy.  WBLO kept its format until the end of the year.

Translator
WBLO is also heard at 106.9 MHz, through a translator in Winston-Salem, North Carolina.

References

External links
Station website

BLO
BLO
Radio stations established in 1947
1947 establishments in North Carolina